= Varakanhalli =

- village
- Country: India
- State: Karnataka
- District: Bellary

Government
  - Body: Gram panchayat

Languages
  - Official: Kannada
- Time zone: UTC+5:30 (IST)
- ISO 3166 code: IN-KA
- Vehicle registration: KA
- Nearest city: Bellary
- Website: karnataka.gov.in

Varakanhalli is a village in the southern state of Karnataka, India.

== See also ==
- Bellary
- Districts of Karnataka
